Riku Selander (born 22 November 1994) is a Finnish professional footballer who plays for AC Oulu, as a midfielder.

Club career
On 24 November 2021, he signed with Oulu for the 2022 season.

References

1994 births
Living people
Finnish footballers
PK-35 Vantaa (men) players
Pallohonka players
FC Honka players
IF Gnistan players
Ekenäs IF players
HIFK Fotboll players
AC Oulu players
Kakkonen players
Ykkönen players
Veikkausliiga players
Association football midfielders